The Air Warrior Drill Team "Subroto" (AWDT) is the ceremonial drill team of Indian Air Force, being a platoon-sized formation. It was founded in 2004 as the first of precision exhibition drill unit of its kind in the Indian Armed Forces. It falls under the command of the Directorate of Organisation of the IAF. This unit commonly performs during IAF events as well as national events such as Air Force Day Parade on 8 October as well as the Independence Day celebrations on 15 August. Their official motto is Drill to Thrill. Its 28 members have also performed at venues such as Sher-i-Kashmir International Conference Centre and Tezpur Airport as well as performed during the IAF Presentation of Colours and the Subroto Cup. The unit uses Lee–Enfield rifles with fixed bayonets and performs routines that include complex spins and tosses.

References

Indian ceremonial units
Military units and formations of the Indian Air Force
Military units and formations established in 2004
2004 establishments in India